Scortum is a genus of Australian fresh and brackish water fishes in the family Terapontidae, the grunters.

Species include:
Scortum barcoo (McCulloch & Waite, 1917) (Barcoo grunter)
Scortum hillii (Castelnau, 1878) (leathery grunter)
Scortum neili Allen, Larson & Midgley, 1993 (Neil's grunter) 
Scortum parviceps (Macleay, 1883) (small-headed grunter)

References

 
Terapontidae

Taxonomy articles created by Polbot